A bodyguard is an individual who protects another from harm or threats.

Bodyguard may also refer to:

Arts, entertainment, and media

Films 
 The Bodyguard (1944 film), a Tom and Jerry short
 Bodyguard (1948 film), American crime film noir directed by Richard Fleischer
 Yojimbo (The Bodyguard), a 1961 Japanese samurai film directed by Akira Kurosawa
 The Bodyguard (1973 film) or Karate Kiba, a Japanese film starring Sonny Chiba
 The Bodyguard (1979 film), a Soviet Red Western film
 My Bodyguard, a 1980 American teen comedy drama film
 The Bodyguard (1992 film), an American romantic thriller film starring Kevin Costner and Whitney Houston
 The Bodyguard (2004 film), a Thai wire fu action-comedy
 The Bodyguard 2 (2007 film), a Thai action comedy sequel film
 Bodyguard (2010 film), a 2010 Malayalam romantic comedy film
 Kaavalan (Bodyguard), a 2011 Tamil remake, or its soundtrack or title track
 Bodyguard (2011 Hindi film), a Hindi remake, or its soundtrack or title track
 Bodyguard (2011 Kannada film), a Kannada remake
 Bodyguard (2012 film), a Telugu remake
 Bodyguard (2016 film), a 2016 Iranian thriller film directed by Ebrahim Hatamikia
 The Bodyguard (2016 film), a Hong Kong drama film

Music
 "Bodyguard" (Bee Gees song), a 1990 song by the Bee Gees
 "Bodyguard", a 2009 song by Shinee
 "Bodyguard", a song by Steel Pulse from their 1984 album Earth Crisis
 The Bodyguard: Original Soundtrack Album, a soundtrack album from the 1992 film

Television
 Bodyguard (South Korean TV series), a South Korean television series
 Bodyguard (British TV series), a 2018 British series
 Bodyguards (TV series), a 1996–1997 British series
 "The Bodyguard" (Supergirl), an episode of Supergirl

Other uses in arts, entertainment, and media
 The Bodyguard (musical), a 2012 stage musical adapted from the 1992 film
 "Bodyguard" (Pugad Baboy), a story arc of the Philippine comic strip Pugad Baboy

People
 The Bodyguard (wrestler), a Japanese professional wrestler

Weapons
Smith & Wesson Bodyguard, a family of small revolvers manufactured by Smith & Wesson
Smith & Wesson Bodyguard 380, a compact semi-automatic pistol manufactured by Smith & Wesson

See also 

 Bodyguard Kiba (disambiguation)